Cantarini is an Italian surname. Notable people with the surname include:

Chayyim Moses ben Isaiah Azriel Cantarini ( 1677), Italian physician, rabbi, poet, and writer
Giorgio Cantarini (born 1992), Italian actor
Isaac Chayyim Cantarini ( Isaacus Viva; 1644–1723), Italian poet, writer, and physician
Judah ben Samuel ha-Kohen Cantarini ( 1650–1694), Italian physician and rabbi
Simone Cantarini (a.k.a. Simone da Pesaro; 1612–1648), Italian painter and etcher

Italian-language surnames